Provincial Airways was a 1930s British airline that was formed in 1933 to operate a service between Croydon and the South West of England, the routes were never a success and the company closed at the end of 1935. The airlines main operating base was Croydon Airport.

History
The company was formed on 12 October 1933 when it took over the assets of International Airlines Limited. International Airlines had attempted to operate a Western Air Express route to carry mail between Croydon, Southampton, Portsmouth and Plymouth using two Monospar ST-4s but the venture failed.

Provincial were to operate a similar route carrying mail, but in the end only two flights from Croydon to Plymouth with a stop at Southamton and return in November 1933 using De Havilland Fox Moths were carried out. In March 1934 they began a weekday service on the London to Plymouth route still using the Fox Moth which was replaced by the larger De Havilland Dragon in May. By 1935 they were flying a twice-daily service between Croydon and Penzance with stops at Portsmouth, Southampton, Bournemouth, Torquay and Plymouth. In February a new route was started between Plymouth and Hull. But the routes were not a financial success and the company closed on 10 December 1935.

Fleet
 de Havilland Dragon 
 de Havilland Fox Moth

See also
 List of defunct airlines of the United Kingdom

References
Notes

Bibliography

Defunct airlines of the United Kingdom
Airlines established in 1933
Airlines disestablished in 1935
1933 establishments in England
1935 disestablishments in the United Kingdom
British companies established in 1933